is a city located in Wakayama Prefecture, Japan. , the city had an estimated population of 61,063 in 27392 households and a population density of 470 persons per km².

Geography
Hashimoto is located near the prefectural border at the northeastern end of Wakayama Prefecture, bordering Kawachinagano in Osaka Prefecture to the north and  Gojō in Nara Prefecture to the east. There are also a couple of small exclaves in the neighboring towns of Katsuragi, Wakayama, and Kudoyama. Because it is close to the plate boundary on the south coast of Honshu, the mountains near Hashimoto are steep; the city is located between the  Kongō Mountains and Kisen Mountains in the north and the Kii Mountains in the south.  Hashimoto is on the middle of the Kinokawa River. In addition, Hashimoto City is located directly above the Japan Median Tectonic Line, which is a large fault that runs east to west in western Japan.

Neighboring municipalities
Wakayama Prefecture
 Kudōyama
Katsuragi
Kōya
Nara Prefecture
 Gojō
Osaka Prefecture
Kawachinagano

Climate
Hashimoto has a humid subtropical climate (Köppen Cfa) characterized by warm summers and cool winters with light to no snowfall.  The average annual temperature in Hashimoto is 13.3 °C. The average annual rainfall is 1781 mm with September as the wettest month.

Demographics
Per Japanese census data, the population of Hashimoto peaked at around the year 2000 and has declined slightly since.

History
The area of the modern city of Hashimoto was within ancient Kii Province, and artifacts from the Jōmon period indicate a long period of human occupancy. Located in the middle reaches of the Kinokawa River, it once prospered as a post town for timber transportation and for pilgrims heading to Mount Kōya. During the late Edo period and Meiji period, sericulture and silk textiles became an important part of the local economy, but they have now disappeared. The village of Hashimoto was established with the creation of the modern municipalities system on April 1, 1889, and was raised to town status on May 10, 1894. On January 1, 1955, Hashimoto merged with the neighboring villages of Kishikami, Yamada, Kimi, Suda, and Kamuro to form the city of Hashimoto. On March 1, 2006, the town of Kōyaguchi (from Ito District) was merged into Hashimoto.

Government
Hashimoto has a mayor-council form of government with a directly elected mayor and a unicameral city council of eighteen members. Hashimoto contributes three members to the Wakayama Prefectural Assembly. In terms of national politics, the city is part of Wakayama 2nd district of the lower house of the Diet of Japan.

Economy
The mainstay of the local economy is horticulture, especially that of Japanese persimmons and Japanese pears, as well as the poultry industry. The area has traditionally been known for its Japanese white crucian carp fish farms and its textiles. As the only city in Wakayama prefecture that is included in the Osaka metropolitan area (in terms of urban employment), there are an increasing number of commuters, gradually transforming the area into a bedroom community.

Education
Hashimoto has fifteen public elementary schools and five public middle schools operated by the city government, in addition to two public high schools and two combined public middle/high schools operated by the Wakayama Prefectural Department of Education. The city also has one private middle school and one private high school. The city also has one private combined elementary/middle school and one private combined middle/high school.

Transportation

Railway
 JR West – Wakayama Line
  -  -  -  - 

 Nankai Electric Railway – Nankai Kōya Line
  -  -  -  -  -

Highway
  Keinawa Expressway

Notable people from Hashimoto
Masaru Furukawa, swimmer
Hideko Maehata, breaststroke swimmer
Junpei Mizobata, actor
Yoshitomo Tsutsugo, baseball player

References

External links

 Hashimoto City official website 

 
Cities in Wakayama Prefecture